The XM70 was a rocket launcher developed for the U.S. Marine Corps from 1959 to 1963 at Rock Island Arsenal, Illinois Research and Development Division.  Seven prototypes were built and tested at Rock Island Arsenal and Aberdeen Proving Ground, Maryland.  The Army intended to develop a self-propelled variant designated the XM71 as the core weapon system matured.

The XM70 has an unusual layout for a rocket launcher, borrowing most of its characteristics from towed howitzers.  It used a closed breach and a hydraulic recoil mechanism rather than allowing rocket exhaust to exit the rear of the device, which allowed the crew to remain nearby to individually aim each rocket and to rapidly reload.  It also had long trail arms and a base plate to pivot the system in common with conventional towed artillery. 

The XM70 employed a unique revolver-like rotary magazine to fire rockets through a single launch tube in succession, rather than individual tubes for each rocket with the intent of improving accuracy while maintaining low overall weight and mobility.   Most multiple launch rocket systems use individual smoothbore tubes roughly the same length of each fin-stabilized rocket bundled in parallel for firing in rapid barrages.  The XM70's single shared long barrel has grooves indicative of rifling to spin the rocket to gyro stabilize it in flight to provide additional accuracy.
United States Patent US4353285 gives detailed technical explanation for Pacific Car and Foundry improvements.

Variants
 XM70
 XM70E1 - prototypes #2 & #3
 XM70E2 - prototypes #4 & #5 (on display at the Rock Island Arsenal museum
 XM70E2 - prototype #6, produced by Pacific Car & Foundry with split trail
 XM70E2 - prototype #7, produced by Pacific Car & Foundry with box trail

See also 
 List of artillery
 List of rocket artillery
 List of howitzers
 List of artillery of the United States

Rocket weapons of the United States